Norton United F.C. was a football club based in Smallthorne, Stoke-on-Trent, Staffordshire, England. They were established in 1989 and joined the Staffordshire Senior League in the same year. They were the Midland League champions three times, North West Counties Football League champions in 2013–14, and were promoted to be members of the Northern Premier League Division One South. On 9 April 2015 it was announced that Norton United would resign from the Northern Premier League at the end of the season and fold.

The club's ground was the Norton Cricket Club & Miners Welfare Institute; however' they left that ground mid season due to contractual issues with the owners and played their remaining fixtures at Lyme Valley Stadium, home of Newcastle Town.. They played in black and red striped shirts, black shorts and black socks.

Honours
North West Counties Football League Premier Division
Champions 2013–14
North West Counties Football League Division One
Runners-up 2011–12
 North West Counties Football League Division One Trophy
Winners 2011–12
 Midland League
Champions 1996–97, 1998–99, 2000–01
 Midland League Cup
Winners 1991–92, 1996–97, 2000–01
 Staffordshire FA Senior Vase
Winners 1998–99, 2003–04
Runners-up 2011–12

Records
FA Cup
First Round Proper 2014–15
FA Vase
Fourth Round 2011–12

References

External links

Defunct football clubs in Staffordshire
Association football clubs established in 1989
Association football clubs disestablished in 2015
Northern Premier League clubs
North West Counties Football League clubs
1989 establishments in England
Sport in Stoke-on-Trent
2015 disestablishments in England
Defunct football clubs in England
Mining association football teams in England